Gretchen M. Hoffman (born April 1957) is a Minnesota politician and former member of the Minnesota Senate who represents District 10, which included all or portions of Becker, Otter Tail and Wadena counties in the northwestern part of the state. A Republican, she is a registered nurse and a former small business owner.

Early life, education, and medical career
Hoffman was born and raised in Fargo, North Dakota. She graduated from Fargo South High School and later completed her R.N. training. She has worked as a cardiac intensive care nurse, an emergency room nurse, a staff nurse, and a Chemotherapy and Oncology nurse. She currently sits on the board of directors of GPK Products, Inc., a family-owned manufacturer of PVC water and wastewater fittings. She also volunteers at a local Pro-Life Clinic as a receptionist and nurse. She is a member of the National Rifle Association.

Minnesota Senate

2010 election
She ran for the Minnesota Senate in the 10th district based in rural Northwest Minnesota. She defeated incumbent Democratic State Senator Dan Skogen 55%-45%.

Tenure
On May 20, 2011, during a  Health and Human Services budget debate, Hoffman tweeted: "#Sen Goodwin just called people with mental illness- idiots and imbeciles- while debating HHS bill #offensive #mndfl #mnsrc #mnleg".  As a result of this tweet, which Senator Barb Goodwin called "mean-spirited" and a deliberate misrepresentation of her statement, an ethics complaint was filed against Hoffman by Senator Ann Rest. The Subcommittee on Ethical Conduct found that Hoffman's statement was "clearly misleading with respect to Goodwin's position regarding the public policy concerning the treatment of individuals with mental illnesses and disabilities" and ordered Hoffman to issue a written apology. On June 21, 2011, the complaint was dismissed by the Ethics Committee after she apologized to Goodwin, removed her original tweet and tweeted a link to the committee’s report on the case.

Committee assignments
Hoffman was a member of the Capital Investment, the Health and Human Services, the Judiciary and Public Safety, and the Taxes committees. Her special legislative concerns included taxes, health and human services, and E-12 education.

2012 congressional race

After redistricting was completed and maps were released, Hoffman decided in February 2012 to run for in Minnesota's 7th congressional district against incumbent Democratic U.S. Congressman Collin Peterson, who represented Minnesota's 10th Senate District himself in the 1970s and 1980s. However, she was unsuccessful in earning the Republican Party's endorsement, which went to Lee Byberg. Byberg was defeated by Peterson in the general election on November 6, 2012.

References

External links

Senator Gretchen Hoffman Web Page
Project Vote Smart - Senator Gretchen Hoffman Profile
Gretchen Hoffman Campaign Web Site

1957 births
Living people
Republican Party Minnesota state senators
Politicians from Fargo, North Dakota
People from Otter Tail County, Minnesota
Women state legislators in Minnesota
21st-century American politicians
21st-century American women politicians